Chalapati or Chalapathi is an Indian masculine given name.

Some notable people with this name are:

 Jonnalagedda Chalapati, is an officer in the Indian Air Force. 
 I. V. Chalapati Rao or Iyyanki Venkata Chalapati Rao,  was an Indian scholar, public speaker, teacher.
 Pappala Chalapathirao or Pappala Chalapati Rao, an Indian politician. 
 Gudlavalleti Chalapati Rao, a noted writer, philosopher.
 T. Chalapathi Rao or Tatineni Chalapati Rao, an Indian music composer who worked in Telugu cinema. 
 Chalapathi Rao or Chalapati Rao, an Indian actor and producer known for comedy and villainous roles in Telugu cinema.
 Manikonda Chalapathi Rau, an Indian journalist. 

Masculine given names